Sulakshana is an Indian actress who has performed in Tamil, Malayalam, Telugu, and Kannada films and serials. She started at the age of two and half in the movie  Kaaviya Thalaivi as child Krishna, she was credited as Dolly. After that she acted in Thulabharam as child artist in Tamil, Telugu, Malayalam, Hindi (all versions) and credited as Rajani . 
 
Her first leading role was with Chandra Mohan in  Subhodayam in 1980. Her second film was with  Rajkumar and he gave advise to her about the importance of make-up as an actress and presented a make- up kit. After that she acted against  K. Bhagyaraj as a third film Thooral Ninnu Pochi. She has acted in over 450 films.

After a 12 year-break from the film industry,  Sulakshana reentered the industry with the teleserial Sahana.

Personal life
She was married to director Gopikrishnan, son of a famous music director M. S. Viswanathan. They have three sons, first son Vishnu is working as a Navy Officer and he got married and second son Shyam is working as customs officer in London Airport and third Son is Studying 2nd standard.
She was born in Rajamahendravaram (Rajahmundry), Andhra Pradesh.

Partial filmography

Tamil

 Thulabharam (1968) - Credited as Baby Rajani (child artist)
 Kaaviya Thalaivi (1970) - Credited as Baby Dolly (child artist)
 Pudhiya Vazhkai (1971) - Credited as Baby Dolly (child artist)
 Police Police
 Thooral Ninnu Pochchu (1982)
 Thambathyam Oru Sangitam (1982)
 Kannoudu Kann (1982)
 Antha Rathirikku Satchi Illai (1982)
 Archanai Pookal (1982)
 Boom Boom Madu (1982)
 Thambhatyam Oru Sangeetham (1982)
 Chinnan Chirusugal (1982)
 Indru Nee Nalai Naan (1983)
 Yugadharmam (1983)
 Idhu Enga Naadu (1983)
 Thoongadhey Thambi Thoongadhey (1983)
 Subha Muhurtham (1983) 
 Yamirukka Bayamen (1983)
 Aayiram Nilave Vaa (1983)
 Miruthanga Chakravarthi (1983)
 Brimmacharigal (1983)
 Puththisali Paithiangal (1983)
 Pozhudhu Vidinjachu (1984)
 Mann Soru (1984)
 Raaja Thandhiram (1984)
 Amma Irukka (1984)
 Anbulla Rajinikanth (1984)
 Thalayanai Mandhiram (1984)
 Thambikku Entha Ooru (1984)
 Kuva Kuva Vaathugal (1984)
 January One (1984)
 Irandu Manam (1985)
 Poi Mugangal (1985)
 Ketti Melam (1985)
 Erimalai (1985)
 Raja Gopuram (1985)
 Amutha Gaanam (1985)
 Oru Malarin Payanam (1985)
 Marudhani (1985)
 Raja Rishi (1985)
 Vilaangu Meen (1985)
 Rajathi Rojakili (1985)
 Sindhu Bhairavi (1985)
 Dharma Pathni (1986)
 Sigappu Malargal (1986)
 Selvaakku (1986)
 Mel Maruvathoor Arpudhangal (1986)
 Poimugangal (1986)
 Murattu Karangal (1986)
 Jigujigu Rail (1986)
 Namma Ooru Nalla Ooru (1986)
 Ondru Engal Jaathiye (1987)
 Ini Oru Sudhanthiram (1987)
 Kaalam Marudhu (1987)
 Neethikku Thandanai (1987)
 Vilangu (1987)
 Sivapputhaali (1988)
 Katha Nayagan (1988)
 Therkkathi Kallan (1988)
 Paattuku Naan Adimai (1990)
 Vaigasi Poranthachu (1990)
 Aarathi Edungadi (1990)
 Kizhakku Vasal (1990)
 Naanum Indha Ooruthan (1990)
 Nee Sirithal Deepavali (1990)
 Naadu Adhai Naadu (1991)
 Mill Thozhilali (1991)
 Naattai Thirudathey (1991)
 Nee Pathi Naan Pathi (1991)
 Pondatti Pondattithan (1991)
 Putham Puthu Payanam (1991)
 Chinna Thambi (1991)
 Pondatti Pondattidhan (1991)
 Bramachari (1992)
 Aavarampoo (1992)
 Thambi Pondatti (1992)
 Aadhityan (1993)
 Nam Nattu Rajakkal (1993)
 Kaviyam (1994)
 Machi (2004)
 Chinna (2005)
 Unnai Naan (2006)
 Pirappu (2007)
 Thodakkam (2008)
 Inba (2008)
 Kondaan Koduthaan (2012)
 Ghajinikanth (2018)

Malayalam

Telugu
 Manushulu Marali (1969)
 Amaayakuraalu (1971) as Young Jothi
 Vamsoddharakudu (1972)
 Shanthi Nilayam (1972)
 Pandanti Kapuram (1972)
 Kattula Rattayya (1972)
 Jeevitham (1973)
 Sarada (1973)
 Subhodhayam (1980)
 Prema Nakshatram (1982)
 Maa Intaina Katha (1983)
 Maa Inti Premayanam (1983)
 Nyavidi (1984)
 Allulu Vasthunnaru (1984)
 Dabbevariki Chedu (1987)
 1940 Lo Oka Gramam (2010)

Kannada

Hindi
 Samaj Ko Badal Dalo (1970)

Voice artist
 Revathi for Punnagai Mannan (1986)
Amala for Mythili Ennai Kaathali (1986)

Television career
Serials

Shows

References

External links

Sulakshana at MSI

Indian film actresses
Actresses in Tamil cinema
Actresses in Telugu cinema
Actresses in Malayalam cinema
Living people
20th-century Indian actresses
Indian television actresses
Actresses in Tamil television
21st-century Indian actresses
Year of birth missing (living people)
Actresses from Rajahmundry
Actresses in Kannada cinema
Actresses in Malayalam television
Actresses in Hindi cinema
Indian voice actresses